NADH dehydrogenase [ubiquinone] 1 subunit C2 is an enzyme that in humans is encoded by the NDUFC2 gene.

The NDUF2 gene encodes one of the subunits of complex I, the first and largest complex of the mitochondrial respiratory chain.

References

Further reading

Human proteins